The 1997–98 Czech First League, known as the Gambrinus liga for sponsorship reasons, was the fifth season of top-tier football in the Czech Republic.

League changes

Relegated to the 1997–98 Czech 2. Liga
 Bohemians Prague (16th)
 Karviná (15th)

Promoted from the 1996–97 Czech 2. Liga
 Dukla (1st)
 Lázně Bohdaneč (2nd)

Stadia and locations

League table

Results

Top goalscorers

See also
 1997–98 Czech Cup
 1997–98 Czech 2. Liga

References

  ČMFS statistics

Czech First League seasons
Czech
1997–98 in Czech football